The Pushkar Fair, also called the Pushkar Camel Fair or locally as Kartik Mela or Pushkar ka Mela is an annual multi-day livestock fair and cultural fête held in the town of Pushkar near Ajmer city in Ajmer district in (Rajasthan, India). The fair starts with the Hindu calendar month of Kartik and ends on the Kartik Purnima, which typically overlaps with late October and early November in the Gregorian calendar. In 1998, over 1 million visitors came to Pushkar throughout the year. The Pushkar fair alone attracts over 200,000 visitors. 

The Pushkar fair is one of India's largest camel, horse and cattle fairs. Apart from the trading of livestock, it is an important pilgrimage season for Hindus to the Pushkar lake. Pushkar fair has also become a significant tourist attraction for domestic and international travellers, given the cooler season, the abundance of colourful cultural themes. Cultural events and competitions include dances, tug of war between women teams as well as men teams, the "matka phod", "longest moustache" competition, "bridal competition", camel races and others.

Thousands of people go to the banks of the Pushkar Lake where the fair takes place. Men trade their livestock, which includes camels, horses, cows, sheep and goats. Rural families shop at the handicraft stalls full of bracelets, clothes, textiles and fabrics. A camel race starts off the festival, with music, songs and exhibitions to follow. Between these events, the most waited for is the test of how the camel is able to bring the items. In order to demonstrate, the men go up on the group of camels one after another.

Pushkar is in centre-east part of Rajasthan, on the western side of Aravalli mountains. Jaipur is well connected with all the major cities in India. Ajmer is also the nearest major railway STATION

See also
 Sonepur Cattle Fair

References

External links

 
A Journey to Pushkar Camel Fair
Pushkar Camel Fair Festival

Festivals in Rajasthan
Fairs in India
Pushkar
Animal festival or ritual
Animal shows
Camels
November events